Sir John A. Macdonald Secondary School can mean:
 Sir John A. Macdonald Secondary School (Hamilton, Ontario)
 Sir John A. Macdonald Secondary School (Waterloo, Ontario)